Hettinger High School is a public high school located in Hettinger, North Dakota, United States. It currently serves 118 students and is a part of the Hettinger School District. The athletic teams are known as the Night Hawks.

Athletics

Championships
State Class 'B' boys' basketball: 1957, 1983
State Class 'A' wrestling: 1966
State Class 'B' wrestling: 1996, 2000, 2001, 2017

Notable alumni
 Rick Berg - current North Dakota Senate Majority Leader

References

External links
 

Public high schools in North Dakota
Schools in Adams County, North Dakota
North Dakota High School Activities Association (Class B)
North Dakota High School Activities Association (9-Man Football)
Public middle schools in North Dakota